Steven Varden is a British Paralympic athlete and swimmer. He won the bronze medal in the men's shot put C2 event at the 1984 Summer Paralympics. He also competed in swimming and he won the silver medal in the men's 25 metre freestyle with aids C2 event.

In 1988, he won the silver medal in the men's club throw C2 event at the 1988 Summer Paralympics held in Seoul, South Korea.

References

External links 
 

Living people
Year of birth missing (living people)
Place of birth missing (living people)
Paralympic silver medalists for Great Britain
Paralympic bronze medalists for Great Britain
Paralympic medalists in athletics (track and field)
Paralympic medalists in swimming
Athletes (track and field) at the 1984 Summer Paralympics
Athletes (track and field) at the 1988 Summer Paralympics
Medalists at the 1984 Summer Paralympics
Medalists at the 1988 Summer Paralympics
Paralympic athletes of Great Britain
Paralympic swimmers of Great Britain
British male shot putters